Southern Steel is the fourth studio album by the American guitarist Steve Morse, released in 1991. "Cut to the Chase" appeared on the soundtrack to Ski Patrol. "Simple Simon" was a minor heavy metal radio hit. Morse promoted the album with a North American tour.

Production
Morse, who wrote all of the album's songs, was backed by drummer Van Romaine and bass player Dave LaRue. Morse first worked on the music for "Arena Rock" during his time with Kansas.

Critical reception

The Calgary Herald wrote: "Obviously an ardent Jeff Beck fan, this one rings with everything Beckish except Jan Hammer." The Chicago Tribune determined that "the album is fast and heavy hick-rock and though it goes through plenty of chord and tempo changes, Morse's fingers never get cold."

The Austin American-Statesman deemed the album Morse's "most mainstream rock to date." The Los Angeles Times called it "instrumental rock in overdrive but with conspicuous intelligence in the driver's seat."

Paul Kohler at AllMusic wrote that "Morse always delivers, especially on this uptempo, hard-hitting, instrumental rock virtuosity."

Track listing

Personnel
Steve Morse – guitar, guitar synthesizer, engineering, mixing, production
Jeff Watson – guitar (track 1), mixing (tracks 1, 2)
Van Romaine – drums
Dave LaRue – bass guitar, engineering
Rick Sandidge – mixing (except tracks 1, 2), mastering
Glen Meadows – mastering

References

External links
In Review: Steve Morse Band "Southern Steel" at Guitar Nine Records

Steve Morse albums
1991 albums
MCA Records albums